Otolithes ruber, commonly known as the tigertooth croaker, is a fish native to Persian gulf and the Indian and western Pacific Oceans and the Bay of Bengal .

References

Fish of Thailand
Sciaenidae